The President of the Senate is one of the 75 members of the Senate of the Netherlands and is elected to lead its meetings and be its representative. The officeholder also chairs the Internal Committee, the Committee of Senior Members as well as the joint sessions of both houses of the States General, the so-called .
 
The office has been held by Jan Anthonie Bruijn of the People's Party for Freedom and Democracy (VVD) since  2019.

See also 
 List of presidents of the Senate (Netherlands)
 Speaker of the House of Representatives (Netherlands)

References

External links 
   
  President of the Senate at Parlement.com 

  
Senate (Netherlands)
Legislative speakers in the Netherlands
Netherlands